Saratov State Academy of Law (Russian: Саратовская государственная юридическая академия) - a legal scientific and educational institution of Russia.

History
Saratov State Academy of Law was founded in 1931. The academy has been named in honor of Kursky D.I. The academy totals 19 faculties.

External links
 Education in Russia for foreigners
 Saratov State Academy of Law under the Ministry of education of the Russian Federation
 Saratov State Academy of Law

Educational institutions established in 1931
Public universities and colleges in Russia
Law schools in Russia
1931 establishments in Russia
Education in Saratov